is the fourth studio album by Japanese singer-songwriter Miyuki Nakajima, released in April 1978.

Five months before the album came out, she topped on the Oricon singles chart with a song "The Parting Song (Wakareuta)", which was released as her fifth single in September 1977. The album features her commercial breakthrough single and another well-known song, "World's Context (Sejou)". The latter was later featured in the second series of TV drama Kimpachi Sensei aired on TBS in 1980, and became known widely as one of her signature songs.

Aishiteiru to Ittekure has been her longest charting album on the Oricon, because the album re-entered the chart when "World's Context" was featured on TV program in the early 1980s.

Track listing
All songs written and composed by Miyuki Nakajima, unless otherwise noted

Side one
All tracks arranged by Kinji Yoshino (except "The Parting Song" co-arranged by Shun Fukui)
"" (Poetry reading, sampling "Prelude, Fugue et Variation, Op. 18 " by César Franck on background music) – 2:58
"" – 2:40
"" – 3:57
"" – 3:27
"" – 5:07

Side two
All tracks arranged by Kinji Yoshino (except "World's Context" co-arranged by Shun Fukui, "Milk 32" and "Omae no Ie" arranged by Miyuki Nakajima)
"" – 4:33
"" – 4:06
"" – 6:32
"" – 6:12

Personnel
Miyuki Nakajima – vocals, acoustic guitar
Toshiro Masuda – electric guitar
Tsugutoshi Goto – electric bass
Ryuichi Sakamoto – keyboards
Nobu Saito – percussions
Hiro Tsunoda – drums

Production
 Recording director; Yoshio Okushima
 Recording and Mixing Engineer; Yoshihiko Kan'nari
 Assistant engineer; Koji Sakakibara
 Manager; Kunio Kaneko
 Director; Yūzō Watanabe
 Cover designer; Natsuo Ueda
 Photographer; Jin Tamura
 Executive producer; Genichi Kawakami

Chart positions

References

Miyuki Nakajima albums
1978 albums
Pony Canyon albums